The Intelligence-Security Agency of BiH, commonly known by its acronym OSA-OBA BiH, is the primary intelligence agency of Bosnia and Herzegovina. It was established   by the Bosnian Parliament in March 2004.

Mission and function
The State Intelligence Service has the following duties:

 collect information from abroad for the purpose of national security;
 undertake intelligence activities for the purpose of the protection of integrity, independence and constitutional order;
 collect information regarding terrorist activity, the production and trafficking of narcotics, the production of weapons of mass destruction and crimes against the environment;
 collect information regarding organized crime that endangers national security.

Relationship with other state entities
Institutional Position of the State Intelligence Service and relationship with other state bodies:

The State Intelligence Service falls under the authority of the Prime Minister. Its Head is appointed and dismissed by the President of the Republic on the advice of the Prime Minister.

OSA operates within this context and while it has been identified as being "generally under effective civilian control" (U.S. Department of State, 2004) the agency has still been associated with various abuses within the country and continues to play a significant role in domestic politics. The Bosnian government has received support from the U.S. and European countries in working to establish or reform national institutions, including its intelligence and security services.

References

Government agencies of Bosnia and Herzegovina
Intelligence agencies
2004 establishments in Bosnia and Herzegovina
Government agencies established in 2004